Nick Thomas may refer to: 

 Nick Thomas (theatre producer) (born 1959), British entertainment entrepreneur
 Nicholas W. Thomas (1810–1864), American politician
 Nicholas Thomas (anthropologist) (born 1960), British anthropologist
 Nicky Thomas (singer) (1949–1990), Jamaican reggae singer
 Nicky Thomas (rugby union), (born 1994), Welsh rugby union footballer

See also
 Nicki Thomas
 Nikki Thomas